Asianet is an Indian Malayalam language general entertainment pay television channel owned by The Walt Disney Company India. a wholly owned by The Walt Disney Company. the channel is headquartered in Kochi. Asianet HD is the first general entertainment HD television channel in Malayalam.

Establishment by Dr Reji Menon
The channel was originally promoted by Dr Reji Menon in the mid 1990s. In late 2006, he partially pulled out of Asianet Communications, turning over control to Rajeev Chandrasekhar (Jupiter Entertainment Ventures). Star India bought a 51% stake in Asianet Communications and formed a joint venture with JEV in November 2008. In 2014, Star India took full ownership of Asianet Communications.

History 

Asianet’s story starts much earlier than in 1993, it starts in Moscow . Dr Reji Menon was a student there and Mr P.Unnikrishnan was the correspondent of PTI in Moscow. Dr Reji Menon became a successful businessman based in Moscow and Mr P Unnikrishnan became the General Manager of PTI in India. When Mr Unnikrishnan initiated the idea of PTI TV, Dr Reji Menon’s nephew Mr Sasikumar was appointed. When the Central government scraped Doordarsan’s monopoly, Mr Unnikrishnan was among the first to react and with Dr Reji Menon they planned to start a National channel. Four of the leading news papers and PTI itself, were to join in with Dr Menon as the Chief promotor and Mr Unnikrishnan at the helm of the Channel ( after his retirement from PTI ). Dr Menon negotiated for a transponder on the Russian satellite EKRAN, with a powerful beam over India , which meant that using a cheep spiral antenna the signal could be received all over India. In the absence of any cable connectivity in India , without the sanction to do terrestrial transmission, this was a good solution. The transponder was very costly, the satellite had the life span of two years and there were only two transponders on the satellite.

In India ill fate hit the idea. Mr Unnikrishnan was terminally ill with lung cancer and now the whole idea was in a limbo. Mr Sashikumar and Mr Madhavankutty of Mathrubhoomi ( Delhi ) suggested tuning down the idea to a Malayalam Channel and Dr Reji Menon agreed and the first Malayalam Channel was born . Asianet’s logo is a derivative of Dr Menon’s company logo. Dr Menon’s office in Chennai became Asianet’s head office. To address the issue of cable networking a separate company called Asianet Satelite Communications was formed. Mr P Bhaskaran the renowned poet was the figurehead chairman. Dr Menon being not full time in India , on his behalf Mr Sashikumar the favourite nephew was in charge. Asianet Communications was registered with Dr C P Chandrasekhar and Mr Sashikumar as the first directors as Dr Menon as a NRI needed RBI clearance to own a media company . Dr Menon bought Uma Studio from the famous Malayalam actor Mr Madhu and this became Asianet’s Puliarkonam Studio. Mr Karunakaran the CM granted sanction to use the Electricity poles for cable networking. This was a mammoth effort.

In the absence of bank financing 50% shares of the cable networking company was sold to Raheja Group. Dr Menon increased Mr Sashikumar's share from the initial 5% to 45% in stages. 5% of the equity was with Mr Raghu Nandan (Dr Menon’ elder brother). Dr Menon bought back the shares earlier given to Mr Sashikumar in 1999 at an agreed price, and took over full control of Asianet.
 
The remaining 50% shares in Asianet Satellite communications, the cable networking company was also sold to The Raheja Group who now had complete ownership of the Cable Networking Company called Asianet Satellite Communications.
 
Asianet started one more channel as Asianet Global on 6 July 2001 to cater to the Malayalees outside India, and this was later restructured into a News Channel.
 
Asianet aired its first news bulletin starting 30 September 1995. Under an arrangement with the Russian embassy with the help of Dr Ratheesh Nair (current), the Gorky Bhavan was repaired and taken over by Asianet. Asianet news operated from Gorky Bhavan from 2000. The central Government sanction for a full-fledged news channel took time and hence it was launched much later than planned on 1 May 2003.

Rajiv Chandrasekhar era (2006–2008)

Star India acquisitions (2008–2014) 
Asianet was restructured into four companies in June 2008 (general entertainment, news, radio and media infrastructure). This move was to allow separate investments in each company. Star India started talks with the owners of the Asianet channels in August, 2008.

Star India eventually bought a 51% stake in Asianet Communications and formed a joint venture with JEV in November 2008. The joint venture, called "Star Jupiter", comprised all general entertainment channels of Asianet 8 October 2013 Bombay 12 March Communications (Asianet, Asianet Plus, Asianet Suvarna and Asianet Sitara) and Star Vijay. Star India had reportedly paid $235 million in cash for the 51% stake and assumed net debt of approximately $20 million. It's not clear how much stake Dr Menon held in the new Star Jupiter venture. Prior to forming the JV, it was known that the original founder had held about 26% stake.

Star India increased its stake in Asianet Communications to 75% in July 2010 (for which Star India paid around $90 million in cash), and to 87%, by acquiring 12% stake for $160 million in June, 2013. The later move was by virtue of acquiring a 19% equity stake in Vijay TV from Chandrasekhar and Asianet Communications MD Madhavan. Following the June, 2013 investment, Asianet Communications was valued at $1.33 billion. Star India acquired 100% stake in Asianet Communications (buying the remaining 13% stake) in March 2014.

On March 20, 2019, Disney's Acquisition of 21st Century Fox, its Indian subsidiary Star India, Star India-owned Asianet Communications and Star India's remaining subsidiaries became a subsidiary of The Walt Disney Company India.

On 2023, Asianet Star Communications was renamed as Disney Star Asianet.

Coverage and viewership 
Asianet has a presence in over 60 countries worldwide including the Indian sub-continent, China, South East Asia, Middle East, Europe, United States and the lower half of the former Soviet Union.

Sister channels

Asianet Plus 

Asianet Plus is second Malayalam General Entertainment pay television channel owned by The Walt Disney Company India. a wholly owned by The Walt Disney Company. it's telecasts serials, retelecast of Asianet's old serials, and movies.

Asianet Movies 

Asianet Movies is an Indian Malayalam language pay television movie channel that was launched on 15 July 2012. The channel is owned by The Walt Disney Company India. a wholly owned by The Walt Disney Company. the channel usually telecast movies that aired on Asianet. It's HD Feed, Asianet Movies HD, launched on March 15, 2023. Asianet Movies HD is the first movies HD channel in Malayalam.

Programming

Direct Television Premiere
In 2005, Katha released directly through Asianet on 14 September 2005 on the occasion of Onam.  Due to COVID-19 pandemic lockdown in India, Malayalam movie Kilometers and Kilometers released directly through Asianet on 30 August 2020 on the occasion of Onam.

Award Functions

Asianet Film Awards 

Asianet has an award ceremony for films presented annually by Asianet. Asianet says that awards ceremony has been instituted to honour both artistic and technical excellence in the Malayalam language film industry.

Asianet Television Awards 

Awards for the Television Serials were started with this name, every year best serials were nominated and presented awards to them.

References

External links 
 

Malayalam-language television channels
Television channels and stations established in 1993
Television stations in Thiruvananthapuram
Disney Star
1993 establishments in Kerala